The Menengai III Geothermal Power Station is a  geothermal power plant under construction in Kenya.

Location
The power plant is located in the Menengai Crater, approximately 30 kilometres (19 mi), north of Nakuru, the location of the district headquarters. This is approximately 185 kilometres (115 mi), by road, northwest of Nairobi, the capital and largest city in Kenya. The coordinates of Menengai Crater are:0°11'43.0"S, 36°04'54.0"E (Latitude:-0.195276; Longitude:36.081678).

Overview

The power stations are:

 Menengai I Geothermal Power Station - Owned by Orpower Twenty Two 
 Menengai II Geothermal Power Station - Owned by Quantum Power East Africa
 Menengai III Geothermal Power Station - Owned by Sosian Energy

The Menengai IPP power projects are expected to come online during the second half of 2017.

Ownership
Menengai III Geothermal Power Station is owned by Sosian Energy Limited, a Kenyan independent power producer (IPP). Sosian Energy has selected Kaishan Renewable Energy Development, a subsidiary of Zhejiang Kaishan Compressor, a Chinese construction conglomerate, to build its geothermal power plant.

Recent developments
In March 2022, the Narendra Raval, a wealthy Kenyan industrialist and business mogul, divested from Sosian Menengai Geothermal Power Limited, a Kenyan independent power producer (IPP) which owns a concession contract to build the 35 megawatts Menengai III Geothermal Power Station. The ownership was sold to Gideon Moi, a son of the late Daniel arap Moi, the second president of Kenya, at an undisclosed monetary consideration.

In April 2022, the African Development Bank (AfDB), which was considering funding this renewable energy infrastructure, withdrew its support for the project and insisted on "change of ownership" before it would consider proving financing.

See also

List of power stations in Kenya
Geothermal power in Kenya

References

External links
GDC reports current steam output of 130 MW at Menengai

Geothermal power stations in Kenya
Power stations in Kenya
Nakuru County